Ronald Setmot Reagent (born April 26, 1995) is an Indonesian footballer who plays as a forward.

Career

PON Papua
13 September 2012, the winning goal scored by Ronald Setmot the 69th minute when the team beat West Java 1-0 (0-0) in the first match of round six branches football PON 2012 in Kaharudin Nasution Stadium, Rumbai, Riau.

Persiram Raja Ampat
The winning goal was contributed by Ronald Setmot in the final minute ahead of the game broke while defeating Mitra Kukar with the score 1-0 in their last match in the last eight Inter Island Cup 2014 at Manahan Stadium, Solo, on Wednesday, January 22, 2014.

References

External links

1994 births
Living people
Association football forwards
Association football midfielders
Indonesian footballers
People from Nabire Regency
Sportspeople from Papua
Papuan sportspeople
Liga 1 (Indonesia) players
Persidafon Dafonsoro players
Persiram Raja Ampat players
Mitra Kukar players
Indonesian expatriate footballers
Indonesian expatriates in Bosnia and Herzegovina
Expatriate footballers in Bosnia and Herzegovina